Romana Hamzová (born 17 August 1970 in Přerov) is a Czech former basketball player who competed in the 2004 Summer Olympics.

References

1970 births
Living people
Czech women's basketball players
Czechoslovak women's basketball players
Olympic basketball players of the Czech Republic
Basketball players at the 2004 Summer Olympics
Sportspeople from Přerov